Kenderick Allen (born September 14, 1978) is a former American football defensive tackle who played in 31 NFL games from 2003 through 2006. He was signed by the New Orleans Saints as an undrafted free agent in 2003. He was also a member of the New York Giants, Green Bay Packers, Cincinnati Bengals and Minnesota Vikings. Allen played college football at Louisiana State University.

Professional career

New Orleans Saints
Allen started his career with the New Orleans Saints in 2003. He was released on August 31, 2003.

New York Giants
He then signed with the New York Giants.

Green Bay Packers
On April 26, 2006, he signed with the Packers. On October 4, 2006, the Packers placed him on injured reserve, ending his 2006 season.

Cincinnati Bengals
On May 11, 2007, Allen signed with the Cincinnati Bengals, his fourth team in five years, but he did not make the team and was released on September 1, 2007.

Minnesota Vikings
On March 20, 2008, he signed with the Minnesota Vikings but did not play for them.

Personal
Allen is a cousin of former defensive lineman Ronald Fields.

References

External links
Green Bay Packers bio
Minnesota Vikings bio

1978 births
Living people
People from Bogalusa, Louisiana
American football defensive tackles
Players of American football from Louisiana
LSU Tigers football players
New Orleans Saints players
New York Giants players
Green Bay Packers players
Cincinnati Bengals players
Minnesota Vikings players